The men's C-1 1000 metres canoeing event at the 2015 Pan American Games will be held between the 11 and 13 of July at the Welland Pan Am Flatwater Centre in Welland.

Schedule
The following is the competition schedule for the event:

All times are Eastern Daylight Time (UTC−4)

Results

Final

References

Canoeing at the 2015 Pan American Games